"The Space Between" is a song written by the Dave Matthews Band. It was released on their 2001 album, Everyday. It was the album's first hit single and the band's first top 40 hit, with its peak at number 22 in the United States – several of their previous singles had been ineligible to chart on the Billboard Hot 100 due to a chart quirk. It is also featured on the Dave Matthews Band compilation album The Best of What's Around Vol. 1. It was played for the first time in 1,446 days at LeRoi Moore’s final concert, on June 28, 2008 and has been played live 115 times.

Music video
The music video, directed by Dave Meyers, was filmed on Lake Pickett surrounded by CGI factories and power plants near Orlando, Florida. The video starts out with Dave Matthews playing an acoustic guitar on a cloudy day on the dock of the pond. Right before the first chorus, an old man in a boat appears, as well as the rest of the band on the dock. The old man appears throughout the rest of the video.

Following the first chorus, a boy and girl sitting in the back of an old pickup truck (in the water) appear. The two appear to be dating, or in love. Also, a young woman in the water, played by actress Jaime Pressly, appears holding her baby. After the verse "We're strange allies with warring hearts, what a wild-eyed beast you be," the song enters the rising action stage. Things become a bit more intense, and the music becomes a faster more upbeat rhythm. Also, dancers in the waters appear.

After the verse "All we can do my love is hope we don't take this ship down," the music pauses. A few seconds later, Matthews resumes singing, and it begins to rain, yet the band plays on. The woman holding her baby brings it even closer to her, and the boy and girl in the pickup embrace. The rain gets harder and harder, and, at one point, the drums that Carter Beauford is playing starts gushing large amounts of water. After the verse "Love is all we need, dear" Beauford pounds on the drums for a second before stopping.

Following the stopping of the drums, the rain goes away, and again it's just Matthews singing on the dock, this time it's a clear night with a full moon. A woman approaches, and the music slowly fades out, while Matthews walks off with her.

This song was also used as a teaser for the 2001 movie Black Hawk Down.

Track listings

U.S. promo single
 "The Space Between" — 4:02
 "I Did It" (acoustic) — 3:27

Australia single
 "The Space Between" (remix) — 3:34
 "The Space Between" — 4:02
 "What You Are" — 4:33

European promo single
 "The Space Between" (radio edit remix) — 3:34

UK CD1 single 
 "The Space Between" (album edit) — 4:02
 "Fool to Think" — 4:13
 "The Space Between" (video) — 3:38

UK CD2 single 
 "The Space Between" (radio edit) — 3:34
 "What You Are" — 3:48
 "I Did It" (video) — 3:38

Charts

Weekly charts

Year-end charts

References

Dave Matthews Band songs
2001 singles
Songs written by Dave Matthews
Music videos directed by Dave Meyers (director)
Rock ballads
2000 songs
Songs written by Glen Ballard
Song recordings produced by Glen Ballard
RCA Records singles